In predicate logic, generalization (also universal generalization or universal introduction, GEN) is a valid inference rule. It states that if  has been derived, then  can be derived.

Generalization with hypotheses
The full generalization rule allows for hypotheses to the left of the turnstile, but with restrictions. Assume  is a set of formulas,  a formula, and  has been derived.

These restrictions are necessary for soundness. Without the first restriction, one could conclude  from the hypothesis . Without the second restriction, one could make the following deduction:
 (Hypothesis)
 (Existential instantiation)
 (Existential instantiation)
 (Faulty universal generalization)

This purports to show that  which is an unsound deduction.

Example of a proof

Proof:

In this proof, universal generalization was used in step 8.  The deduction theorem was applicable in steps 10 and 11 because the formulas being moved have no free variables.

See also
First-order logic
Hasty generalization
Universal instantiation

References 

Rules of inference
Predicate logic